Jiří Vaněk (born 24 April 1978) is a former professional tennis player from the Czech Republic. He was a coach of former world #1 player Karolína Plíšková and is the current coach of two-time Wimbledon champion Petra Kvitová, with whom he has a romantic relationship with since August 2021.

Tennis career

Juniors
He was an impressive junior, reaching as high as No. 14 in the junior singles world rankings (and No. 21 in doubles) in 1995, making the semifinals of the French Open and the quarterfinals of the Australian Open boys' singles in 1996.

Pro tour
Vanek turned professional in 1996, winning 11 Challenger events and reaching a career-high singles ranking of World No. 74 in October 2000.

He competed in the 2000 Summer Olympics in Sydney, reaching the second round.

ATP career finals

Doubles: 1 (1 runner-up)

ATP Challenger and ITF Futures finals

Singles: 22 (11–11)

Doubles: 6 (1–5)

Performance timeline

Singles

References

External links
 
 

1978 births
Living people
Czech male tennis players
Olympic tennis players of the Czech Republic
People from Domažlice
Tennis players from Prague
Tennis players at the 2000 Summer Olympics
Tennis players at the 2008 Summer Olympics
Czech tennis coaches